Sayon Cooper (born 24 April 1974) is a retired Liberian sprinter. He is a graduate of Abilene Christian University in Abilene, Texas where he earned the 1997 NCAA Division II championship in both the 100 m and 200 m dashes.  Cooper is a member of Alpha Phi Alpha fraternity.

He represented Liberia at the 1996 & 2000 Summer Olympics, competing in the Men's 100 m, 200 m, and Men's 4 x 100 m relay.
He also competed at the World Championships in 1997, 1999, 2001 and 2003 as well as the World Indoor Championships in 1999 and 2001. He has not competed on the international level since 2003.

His personal best time in the 100 metres is 10.15 seconds, achieved in May 1997 in Abilene. In the 200 metres he clocked a best time of 20.50 seconds in June 2000 in Kourou.

External links
 
 NCAA.org records (see 1997)
 ESPN results from 2000 Summer Olympics

1974 births
Living people
Liberian male sprinters
Athletes (track and field) at the 1996 Summer Olympics
Athletes (track and field) at the 2000 Summer Olympics
Olympic athletes of Liberia
Abilene Christian University alumni
World Athletics Championships athletes for Liberia